KHKV (91.1 FM) is a radio station broadcasting a Spanish religious radio format. Licensed to Kerrville, Texas, United States, the station serves the Kerrville-Fredericksburg area. The station is currently owned by Houston Christian Broadcasters, Inc.

History
The station was assigned the call letters KBBP on February 20, 1998. On April 6, 1998, the station changed its call sign to KKER, on February 1, 2002 to the current KHKV, On January 4, 2001 the station was sold to Houston Christian Broadcasters, Inc.

Translators

References

External links

Radio stations established in 1998
HKV
1998 establishments in Texas
Kerrville, Texas
HKV